Ferhat Dogruel (born 2 August 1980) is a Belgian former professional footballer who played as a defender.

Career
At the age of 16, Dogurel debuted for Patro Eisden in the Belgian second division.

In 1997, he joined the youth academy of German Bundesliga side Schalke 04 amid interest from the Netherlands as well as the most successful Belgian clubs.

In 1998, he signed for Altay in the Turkish top flight before joining Belgian lower league team Sprimont.

In 2007, Dogruel signed for Kırşehirspor in the Turkish third division.

References

External links
 

1980 births
Living people
Belgian footballers
Sportspeople from Genk
Footballers from Limburg (Belgium)
Belgian people of Turkish descent
Association football defenders
K. Patro Eisden Maasmechelen players
Altay S.K. footballers
K.F.C. Verbroedering Geel players
Kırşehirspor footballers
Tokatspor footballers
Süper Lig players
TFF Second League players
Belgian expatriate footballers
Expatriate footballers in Germany
Expatriate footballers in Turkey
Belgian expatriate sportspeople in Germany
Belgian expatriate sportspeople in Turkey